The New Zealand Māori word Kaimanawa relates to two separate things:

The Kaimanawa Range of mountains, in the North Island
Kaimanawa horses, a feral horse found in the area